Kallichroma is a genus of fungi in the class Sordariomycetes which consists of two species.

References

Sordariomycetes genera
Bionectriaceae